Elmar Ledergerber (born April 4, 1944 in Engelberg) is a former Mayor of Zurich. He is a member of the Social Democratic Party of Switzerland and was once named one of the most outstanding mayors of the year by a London think-tank. However he has also been criticized for not seeing through projects. He is currently active in promoting tourism to Zurich.

Ledergerber holds a doctoral degree in economics from the University of St. Gallen.

References 

Mayors of Zürich
1944 births
Living people
University of St. Gallen alumni